Proxenus of Atarneus is most famous for being Aristotle's guardian after the death of his parents.  Proxenus educated Aristotle for a couple of years before sending him to Athens to Plato's Academy. He lived in Atarneus, a city in Asia Minor.

Proxenus had married Aristotle's older sister Arimneste, whereby they had a daughter Hero and a son Nicanor.  Hero's own son, Callisthenes, would later become a student and collaborator with his great-uncle Aristotle.  Nicanor eventually married Aristotle's daughter, Pythias.

References
Diogenes Laërtius, Life of Aristotle. Translated by C.D. Yonge.
 Eduard Zeller, Aristotle and the Earlier Peripatetics (1897).

4th-century BC Athenians
Aristotle